The Liberal Party of Australia (Tasmanian Division), commonly known as the Tasmanian Liberals, is the state division of the Liberal Party of Australia in Tasmania. The party currently governs in Tasmania. The party is part of the federal Liberal Party of Australia, currently in opposition.

History
In 1904, Elliott Lewis established the National League, which changed its name to the Progressive League in 1907. While Lewis became Premier of the state in 1909 under this banner, the League itself shortly disappeared. Its successor was the Tasmanian Liberal League, founded later that year in collaboration with the Tasmanian Farmers and Stockowners Association. In 1917, the League affiliated with the Australian Liberal Union.

Following the removal of Billy Hughes from the leadership of the Labor Party, the League merged again to become the Tasmanian National Federation. It shared government with the Labor Party from 1912 to 1923, and then from 1928 to 1934. Despite the establishment of the United Australia Party by Joseph Lyons, the party continued using the name National until 1941 when it changed its name to the 'United Australia and National Organisation'. In 1945 the party came under the umbrella of the new Liberal Party of Australia.

The Tasmanian Division of the party was formed at a meeting in Hobart on 13 February 1945. The first state candidates stood at the 1946 election, most of whom were ex-servicemen. The organisation recruited them by arguing that in the services they had been fighting for freedom, and it was now their duty 'to finish the job'. The party first formed a government in Tasmania 1969.

In 1982, Robin Gray was elected on a platform of commitment to building the Gordon-below-Franklin hydro-electric power scheme. Continual blockades from the Labor Federal Government lead to the Premier threatening to secede from the Commonwealth if any further intervention was taken. Despite the lack of success in the Tasmanian Dam Case, the Gray government won the 1986 state election and held onto power until 1989.

The party was elected at the 1992 state election with Ray Groom as leader, however at the subsequent 1996 election following a promise not to form minority government Groom resigned. Tony Rundle was quick to replace Groom as Liberal leader and reached an informal agreement with the Tasmanian Greens to secure support.

At the 2014 state election, Will Hodgman secured a majority of seats following a 16-year incumbent Labor government led by Lara Giddings. The party was re-elected at the 2018 state election. Hodgman retired from politics in January 2020 and was succeeded by Peter Gutwein as party leader and Premier. On 22 March 2021, lower house MP Sue Hickey announced that she would quit the Liberal Party and sit as an independent, slamming the state Liberals as "unable to accommodate strong women" after being told by Gutwein that she would not be endorsed for the next election. The Liberal government lost its majority and plunged into minority government. The party was re-elected at the May 2021 state election and regained majority government status. In April 2022, Gutwein retired from politics and was succeeded by his deputy Jeremy Rockliff as party leader and Premier.

Organisation
Each division of the Liberal Party is autonomous, with a unique organisational structure and their own constitutions.

Premiers
Seven parliamentary Liberal leaders have served as Premier of Tasmania: Angus Bethune (1969–1972), Robin Gray (1982–1989), Ray Groom (1992–1996), Tony Rundle (1996–1998), Will Hodgman (2014–2020), Peter Gutwein (2020–2022) and Jeremy Rockliff (2022–present).

Deputy Premiers
Seven parliamentary Liberal deputy leaders have served as Deputy Premier of Tasmania: Max Bingham (1982–1984), Geoff Pearsall (1984–1988), Ray Groom (1988–1989), John Beswick (1992–1996), Sue Napier (1996–1998), Jeremy Rockliff (2014–2022) and Michael Ferguson (2022–present).

List of parliamentary leaders
 Neil Campbell (1945–1950)
 Rex Townley (1950–1956)
 Tim Jackson (1956–1960)
 Angus Bethune (1960–1972)
 Max Bingham (1972–1979)
 Geoff Pearsall (1979–1981)
 Robin Gray (1981–1991)
 Ray Groom (1991–1996)
 Tony Rundle (1996–1999)
 Sue Napier (1999–2001)
 Bob Cheek (2001–2002)
 Rene Hidding (2002–2006)
 Will Hodgman (2006–2020)
 Peter Gutwein (2020–2022)
 Jeremy Rockliff (2022–present)

State election results

Federal election results

References

Further reading
 Lucadou-Wells R (1994) 50 year history of the Liberal Party (Tasmanian Division), Hobart, Tasmania.

External links

 Tasmanian Liberals Official website
 Liberal Party of Australia Federal party official site
 Liberal Party of Australia ephemera digitised and held by the National Library of Australia

Tasmania
Political parties in Tasmania